Giancarlo Cornaggia-Medici (16 December 1904 – 23 November 1970) was an Italian fencer and Olympic champion in épée competition.

Biography
He received a gold medal in épée individual at the 1932 Summer Olympics in Los Angeles. He received a gold medal in épée team in 1928 and in 1936, and a silver medal in 1932.

References

External links
 

1904 births
1970 deaths
Italian male fencers
Olympic fencers of Italy
Fencers at the 1928 Summer Olympics
Fencers at the 1932 Summer Olympics
Fencers at the 1936 Summer Olympics
Olympic gold medalists for Italy
Olympic silver medalists for Italy
Olympic bronze medalists for Italy
Olympic medalists in fencing
Medalists at the 1928 Summer Olympics
Medalists at the 1932 Summer Olympics
Medalists at the 1936 Summer Olympics
20th-century Italian people